Martina Hingis was the defending champion and successfully defended her title, by defeating Sandrine Testud 6–3, 7–5 in the final.

Seeds
The top four seeds received a bye into the second round.

Draws

Finals

Top half

Bottom half

References
 Main Draw (WTA)

Toray Pan Pacific Open - Singles
2000 Singles
2000 Toray Pan Pacific Open